Two ships of the British Royal Navy have been named HMS Bangor.

, a  commissioned in 1999.

Battle honours
Ships named Bangor have earned the following battle honours:
Dieppe 1942
Normandy 1944
English Channel 1944
Al Faw 2003

Royal Navy ship names